Gabriel Julio Fernández Capello (born July 24, 1964, in Buenos Aires, Argentina) is a musician and composer better known by his stage name Vicentico. Co-founder and vocalist of the band Los Fabulosos Cadillacs along with Flavio Cianciarulo. He was part of the group since its creation in 1984 to the year 2001, when he began a solo career as a singer. Vicentico won the Latin Grammy Award for Best Rock Album in 2021 for El Pozo Brillante and Best Rock Song for "Ahora 1".

He lives with his wife, actress Valeria Bertucelli, and their sons Florián and Vicente.

Albums 
 Vicentico (2002)
 Los Rayos (2004)
 Los pájaros (2006)
 Solo un Momento (2010)
 Vicentico 5 (2012)
 Último acto (2014)
 El hombre (2016)
 El Pozo Brillante (2021)

References 

1964 births
Living people
20th-century Argentine male singers
Grammy Award winners
Rock en Español musicians
Sony Music Latin artists
Latin music songwriters
Rock songwriters
21st-century Argentine male singers
Latin Grammy Award winners